Četekovac  is a village in Croatia. 

Populated places in Virovitica-Podravina County